Mesosa laxa is an extinct species of beetle in the family Cerambycidae, that existed during the Lower to Middle Miocene. It was described by Zhang in 1989.

References

laxa
Beetles described in 1989